Monghsat Airport is an airport in Monghsat, Myanmar . On average, it has 1 departure flight each day.

Airlines and destinations

References

Airports in Myanmar